David or Dave Wight may refer to:
David Wight (cricketer) (born 1959), cricketer from the Cayman Islands
David Wight (rower) (1934–2017), American gold medalist at the 1956 Melbourne Olympics
Dave Wight, member of the band London

See also 
David White (disambiguation)